Broken Eggs is a painting executed in 1756 by French artist Jean-Baptiste Greuze. Done in oil on canvas, the painting depicts an old woman rebuking a young man who is responsible for having broken the eggs in the basket of a servant girl who sits dejectedly on the floor. It is the first of many paintings by Greuze in which he uses broken objects as a metaphor for the loss of a young girl's virginity. Greuze exhibited the work in the Salon of 1757 with an explanatory title: Une Mère grondant un jeune Homme pour avoir renversé un Panier d’Oeufs que sa Servante apportoit du Marché. Un Enfant tente de raccomoder un oeuf cassé ("A mother scolding a young man for having overturned a basket of eggs that her servant brought from the market. A child attempts to repair a broken egg"). 

It is now in the Metropolitan Museum of Art, which acquired it in 1920.

References

1756 paintings
Paintings in the collection of the Metropolitan Museum of Art
Paintings by Jean-Baptiste Greuze